Golden Days is the second album released by the duo Brian May and Kerry Ellis. Their first album together as a duo was Acoustic by Candlelight, which is a live album, although they first worked together on Ellis' second studio album Anthems, which May produced. The album was first released on 7 April 2017 and reached number 27 in the UK Albums Chart.

Release and critical reception 

The album was originally to be called Anthems II, named after Ellis' album Anthems, which May produced and wrote or co-wrote five of the songs. It was scheduled to be released in March 2017. The release date changed to 7 April 2017 as did the album title to Golden Days

In a press release, May said of the album:

The album entered the UK Albums Chart on 20 April 2017 and climbed to number 27 and spent just one week on the charts.

Upon its release, Golden Days received mixed reviews from music critics. Nicky Sweetland of the South London Press wrote "This album is another triumph for the team of May and Ellis and is almost guaranteed to be a hit" and gave it five stars. While Helen Jones of The Reviews Hub wrote, "Overall this is a pleasant and easy to listen to album that has a couple of outstanding cover tracks, nice album but not the most memorable".

Track listing

Credits and personnel 

Kerry Ellis – lead and backing vocals
Brian May – Guitar, vocals, keyboards, sitar, gayageum, bass guitar, arrangements
Neil Fairclough – Bass guitar
Justin Shirley-Smith – Engineer
Kris Fredriksson – Engineer
John Miceli – Drums, Engineer (additional)
Rufus Taylor – Drums
Josh Macrae – Engineer (additional)
Stanislav Barochy – Engineer (additional)
Jeff Leach – Keyboards (additional)

References 

2017 albums
Brian May albums
Kerry Ellis albums
Sony Music albums